Sông Cầu is an urban ward (phường) of Bắc Kạn, Bắc Kạn Province, in Vietnam.

Populated places in Bắc Kạn province
Communes of Bắc Kạn province
Bắc Kạn